Private Life of Kuzyayev Valentin is a 1967 Soviet drama film directed by Ilya Averbakh and Igor Maslennikov.

Plot 
High school student Valentin Kuzyaev is invited to shoot a TV show about youth. For preparation, he is given a questionnaire. The questions in the questionnaire are the simplest, but it is difficult for Vale to answer them. To understand himself, he begins to keep a diary.

Cast 
 Viktor Ilichyov as Valentin Kuzyaev
  Irina Tereshenkova  as TV presenter
 Avgust Baltrusaitis  as Vladimir
  Vladislav Bogach   as episode
 Anatoliy Yegorov   as Valentin Kuzyaev's friend
  Tamara Konovalova  as Margarita
  Zoya Krasnova  as Zoya 
  Georgy Shtil  as Pyotr Kuzyaev
 Maria Pakhomenko as cameo

Production
Ilya Averbakh directed the short stories  Out  and  Daddy, and the short story  Kuzya and Margarita  was shot by Igor Maslennikov.

References

External links 
 

1967 films
1960s Russian-language films
1960s teen drama films
1967 drama films
Soviet teen drama films
Soviet black-and-white films
1967 directorial debut films
Lenfilm films
Films directed by Ilya Averbakh
Films directed by Igor Maslennikov